Zabllaq is a village in the municipality of Istog, Kosovo.

Demographics 
The village of Zabllaq has a total of 459 inhabitants.

Notes

References

Villages in Istog